The Chrysler/Dodge/Plymouth Neon is a front-engine, front-wheel drive compact car that was introduced in January 1994 for model year 1995 by Chrysler's Dodge and Plymouth divisions in two- and four-door bodystyles over two generations.

Marketed in Europe, Mexico, Canada, Japan, Egypt, Australia, South Africa and South America as a Chrysler, the Neon was offered in multiple versions and configurations over its production life, which ended after the 2005 model year.

The Neon nameplate was subsequently resurrected in 2016 for the Dodge Neon, a rebadged variant of Fiat Tipo sedan for the Mexican market.

1991 concept car
The Neon nameplate first appeared as a concept car in 1991 under the Dodge brand. Although radically styled and clearly not production-ready featuring sliding suicide doors, the Neon concept resembled the future production vehicle.

The Neon concept was designed by Chrysler designers who had joined the company from Chrysler's buyout of American Motors Corporation (AMC) in 1987.

First generation (1993)

The first generation Neon was introduced in January 1994 and manufactured until August 1999. It was available as a four-door notchback sedan and a two-door notchback coupe.

The car was badged and sold as both a Dodge and a Plymouth in the United States and Canada; in Mexico was sold as Dodge and Chrysler, and in Europe, Australia and other export markets it was sold as the Chrysler Neon. At the Neon's release, then president of Chrysler Corporation Bob Lutz said, "There's an old saying in Detroit: 'Good, fast, or cheap. Pick any two.' We refuse to accept that." The Japanese press touted the Neon as the "Japanese car killer", due to a spiralling Yen due to the Japanese "bubble economy" crash and the lower production cost of the Neon. The Neon also became the first Chrysler small car sold in Japan but despite focused attention, only 994 were sold in Japan between June to December 1996. The Neon was classed in the larger "Normal sized Passenger vehicles" tax bracket according to Japanese Government dimension regulations which obligated Japanese owners for additional yearly road taxes which affected sales. Car and Driver tested the DOHC 5-speed equipped Neon R/T and reported that it could run 0–60 in 7.6 seconds and 15.9 seconds in the quarter mile. First-generation Neons were competitive in SCCA Solo autocross and showroom-stock road racing.

Equipment
Neons had unconventional option availability, including the lack of power windows in the rear doors. Certain color base-model Neons, including red and black, had bumper covers molded in color rather than painted. These covers, while textured and not as glossy as paint, absorbed scuffs and scrapes with less visible damage. The mid-level Highline models in 1995 and 1996 used wheel covers with a bubble design. Initially, Neons were available in many bold colors including Nitro yellow-green, Lapis Blue, Aqua, and Magenta. Paint color choices became more subdued by the 1998-1999 model years, as the majority of buyers opted for more conventional tones.

In the Australian market, Chrysler Neons came in two models, the SE and the better-equipped LX. Later, the LX model was replaced by the LE with the updated model in 1999.

In Japan, only the sedan was offered. It was very similar to those sold in the Australian market. it was equipped with amber turn signal indicators next to the tail lights to comply with Japanese regulations and a side indicator installed in the fender behind the front wheel opening.

In the United States, the lineup started out as Base, Highline, and Sport, with different styles and options in each line, but the lineup titles changed frequently (other trim lines included Expresso, SE, ES, SXT, ACR, and R/T).

In Europe, the car was available with a 1.8 L engine. Europe received one limited edition model, the CS that came only in Platinum paint. It was fitted with the  SOHC engine, American R/T specification suspension (slightly lower,  rear,  front), rear spoiler, unique alloy wheels, standard leather interior, dual stainless steel exhaust, a six CD changer, and a shorter 5-speed manual gearbox.

Production figures 

*Production figures for 1999 were not provided

*Production figures for 1999 were not provided

Trim levels

Plymouth Neon: 1995–1999
base - 1995-1995 - Standard features included 2.0L Inline 4-cylinder engine, 5-speed manual transmission, 13-inch steel wheels with wheel covers, AM/FM stereo with 4 speakers and dual front SRS airbags.
Highline - 1994–1999- Added to Base air conditioning, side molding, daytime lights, remote trunk release, painted bumper.
Sport - 1994–1996- Added to Highline color-keyed wheel covers, AM/FM stereo with a cassette player, equalizer, CD changer controls, and 6 speakers.
Expresso - 1995–1999- Added to Highline power front windows an AM/FM stereo with cassette player.
EX - 1997–1999
ACR - 1995–1999- Stood for American Club Racer, added alloy wheels to Base.
Style - 1997–1999

Dodge Neon: 1995–1999
base - 1995-1995- Standard features included 2.0L Inline 4-Cylinder (I4) engine, 5-speed manual transmission., 13-inch steel wheels with wheel covers, AM/FM stereo with 4 speakers and dual front SRS airbags.
Highline - 1995–1999- Added to Base air conditioning.
Sport - 1995–1999- Added to Highline color-keyed wheel covers, AM/FM stereo with a cassette player including an equalizer, CD changer controls, and 6 speakers.
EX- 1997–1999
ACR - 1995–1999- Stood for American Club Racer, added alloy wheels to Base.
R/T - 1998–1999- Added to Highline white hood and trunk "Rally" stripes, white-painted alloy wheels, AM/FM stereo with a cassette player including an equalizer, CD changer controls, and 6 speakers, as well as a rear spoiler.

Chrysler Neon (Canada): 2000–2002
LE - 2000–2002 (entry level trim)
LX - 2000-2002
R/T – 2001-2002 (manual transmission only)

Chrysler Neon (Europe): 1995–1999
LE - 1995–1999
LX - 1995–1999
SLX - June 1997 – 1999
GLX - October 1997 – 1999
CS - February 1998 – 1999

Special models

ACR

The ACR Neon, available with the DOHC engine, featured four-wheel disc brakes, Arvin non-adjustable struts for 1995–1996 models and Koni adjustable dampers for 1997–1999 models, thicker anti-sway bars, stiffer suspension bushings, fast-ratio steering, heavy-duty wheel hubs, and a five-speed manual transmission with a shorter .81 fifth gear and final drive ratio of 3.94 for quicker acceleration. 1995 through 1997 models featured adjustable camber. The ACR offers no badging to distinguish it from other Neon models; the only visible differences are a bumper with fog light holes, but no fog lights and a lack of side moldings. For 1995, the ACR was only offered to SCCA members, but in subsequent years it was available to the general public. The name "ACR" was initially the internal ordering code for the "Competition Package", as it was termed in dealer materials; however, as knowledge of the model spread, the ACR name stuck. The backronym "American Club Racer" was coined due to its popularity with club and grassroots racers. To save weight, both the standard A/M-F/M radio with cassette player and air conditioning could be deleted, both for credit.

R/T

The R/T model (Road/Track) debuted in the 1998 model year. Offered only with a 5-speed DOHC configuration, the R/T featured many of the ACR's mechanical upgrades including the numerically higher ratio 3.94 5-speed manual transmission, with the .81 5th gear and 130 mph speed limit. The R/T, however, was intended for the street, with more comfort and convenience features standard or available, and specialized parts like the adjustable dampers removed, although the dampers, as well as the front coil springs found on R/T models, were slightly stiffer, offering an advantage over standard model Neons. R/Ts featured optional stripes over the top of the car, silver "R/T" badging on the front door panels and the right side of the trunk deck lid, and a functional wing. The "Stripe Delete" option was available from the factory, but with no credit to the Neon's price. All striped R/Ts (black, red, blue) had silver-colored stripes, with the exception of the White R/Ts, which came with dark blue colored stripes. The R/T was available in the 4-door body style with limited numbers made.

Second generation (2000) 

Sales of the second generation model started with the 2000 model year and production ended with the 2005 model year. The second-generation Neon was only available as a four-door sedan. An optional Magnum engine configuration (with an active intake manifold, and other engine revisions to increase power) that produced  was available. Both engines had a redline of 6762 rpm.

The second generation was more refined than the first-generation car. It was advertised that the second generation Neon had over 1,000 refinements from the original generation. The first generation's frameless windows were replaced with a full-framed door. Other NVH refinements were implemented. The new interior and greater size increased weight. The DOHC engine (Chrysler code name ECC) was no longer available.

In 2000, the R/T trim returned after a one-year hiatus. The R/T consisted of a new  SOHC Magnum 2.0 L Engine,  wheels, spoiler, dual chrome exhaust tips, quicker steering box and stiffer springs. The 2001 and 2002 R/Ts had a flat, 'hammerhead' spoiler. From 2000 to 2003, the R/T was sold as a Chrysler in the United Kingdom. The Neon was offered with a sport package for the 2001 model year only commemorating Dodge's return to the NASCAR scene, called the Motorsports Edition. It was available on SE, ES, and R/T and on SE/ES models, consisted of an R/T wing, R/T  wheels, R/T springs, Goodyear NASCAR raised yellow-lettering tires, 'Dodge Motorsports' side decals, white instrument cluster, and R/T steering box. SE and ES cars were an R/T visually except for the lack of dual exhaust, R/T lower moldings, fog lamps, and R/T exclusive front bumper. The SE and ES only came equipped with the base model's  engine and was available with an automatic transmission (unlike the manual-only R/T model), the R/T retained the 150hp Magnum engine. In 2001, there was also a Sport Appearance Package available on SE and ES, which added the R/T wing and 16” wheels as well as other option availability. 2001 was the last year for the Plymouth Neon, and the Plymouth brand as well. The last Plymouth Neon, which was also the last Plymouth ever produced (a silver four-door sedan), rolled off the assembly line on June 28, 2001.

The former Dodge and Plymouth Neon were briefly sold under the Chrysler name in Canada from 1999 to 2002, until being renamed as Dodge SX 2.0 for 2003. As before, in Europe, Australia, Mexico, Asia, South Africa and South America, it continued to be sold as a Chrysler, as Dodge and Plymouth passenger cars were not marketed outside the U.S. and Canada at the time. Besides the 2.0 L engine, it used the same Tritec 1.6 L unit found in the MINI prior to 2007. The 1.6 L unit is a variation of the 2.0 L SOHC engine designed by Chrysler and built by Tritec.

Originally, the second generation Neon featured a five-speed manual transmission using the former ACR gear ratios to improve acceleration. However, this hurt gas mileage and made the car noisier on the highway, and eventually, the original gear ratios were restored. A four-speed automatic (41TE) was offered in the Neon for the 2002 model year, and the 03-05 received an updated 40TE four-speed auto, replacing the earlier 3-speed 31TH. 

The Chrysler Neon was renamed Dodge SX 2.0 in Canada for 2003 and sold at Dodge dealerships. In Australia and Canada, the Chrysler Neon was discontinued in 2002.
In 2002, the front clip was changed to match the R/T and ACR front clip with the exception of missing a lower lip.

The Neon was facelifted once again for 2003 with large "crosseyed" headlights and crosshair grille to make it look more like a Dodge Caravan and Dodge Stratus.

The ACR model was discontinued for 2003; the R/T model for 2004. The Chrysler Neon continued to be sold in Europe until 2004.

In Brazil, the Neon was marketed as a luxury mid-size sedan; for Mexico it was a competitor to the Ford Escort, and sold as a Chrysler with either the 1.6 or 2.0 L engine and European-style taillights (with separate amber indicator lights), except for the R/T model, which was a Dodge, with U.S.-style taillights.

For the Dutch market, the Neon proved more successful than for the rest of the Continent. Trim levels were 2.0 LX and 2.0 SE. However, some grey import versions came in from Mexico.

This generation continued to be offered in Japan from 1999 to 2001. The Japanese version was installed with a leather interior and was marketed as a small luxury car to Japanese consumers. In 2002, the Neon was replaced by the Chrysler PT Cruiser in Japan.

Trim levels
Dodge Neon: 2000–2005
Highline - 2000–2001- Included 2.0 L 4-cylinder engine, 5-speed manual transmission, AM/FM stereo with cassette player and 4 speakers, 14-inch steel wheels with wheel covers, manual windows, manual door locks, air conditioning, and anti-lock braking system (ABS).
ES - 2000–2002- Added 15-inch alloy wheels, power door locks, and power front windows to Highline.
SE - 2001–2005- Basically same features as Highline.
R/T - 2001–2004- Added color-keyed exterior features and rear spoiler to ES.
Motorsports Edition - 2001
ACR - 2001-2002- Stood for American Club Racer.
base - 2002

S - 2002
SXT - 2002–2005- Added 15-inch alloy wheels, AM/FM stereo with single-disc CD player and 6 speakers, rear spoiler, power front windows, keyless entry, and power door locks to SE.
SRT-4 - 2003–2005- A turbocharged and intercooled 2.4 L 4-cylinder gasoline engine (A853 engine), 2.25-inch exhaust with 2 resonators, no muffler, and dual 3.75-inch stainless steel tips, suspension upgrades (stiffer springs and struts, ACR came with adjustable Tokico Illumina struts), larger brakes, 17x6-inch alloy wheels (16x7-inch for ACR), and high-profile rear wing spoiler.

Plymouth Neon: 2000–2001
Highline - 2000–2001- Included 2.0 L I4 engine, 5-speed manual transmission, AM/FM stereo with cassette player and 4 speakers, 14-inch steel wheels with wheel covers, manual windows, manual door locks, manual air conditioning, and anti-lock braking system (ABS).
LX - 2000–2001

Chrysler Neon: 2000–2004 (Europe)
R/T - 2000–2003
LX - 2000–2004
SE - 2000–2003

Chrysler Neon: 2000–2002 (Canada)
LE - 2001 Limited Edition
SE - 2000–2002

Final year
DaimlerChrysler discontinued the Neon, with the final cars assembled on September 23, 2005 at the Belvidere Assembly plant in Belvidere, Illinois. The Neon was replaced in the spring of 2006 with the 2007 Dodge Caliber, which is based on the shared Chrysler/Mitsubishi Motors GS platform. Like the Neon, the Caliber had an SRT-4 variant, but like the standard Caliber, it used a completely different engine. The Belvidere plant underwent retooling for the Caliber, Jeep Compass, and Patriot.

In markets like Australia the Neon range was reduced to either 2.0 LX or 2.0 SE models.

Safety
The first generation Neon earned a "Poor" rating in an offset frontal Crash test conducted by the Insurance Institute for Highway Safety. The second generation Neon earned a higher "Marginal" rating. The second generation were rated as "Poor" in the side impact crash test (IIHS Safety ratings go from "Poor", to "Marginal", "Acceptable" and "Good"). By comparison, the Chevrolet Cavalier performed worse in the small car category in 2005, the Neon's final year. Other cars made from 2000 to 2005 that were rated "Poor" when tested without optional side airbags included the Ford Focus, Toyota Corolla, Toyota Prius, Mitsubishi Lancer, and Chevrolet Cobalt. No small car made in this period, tested without side airbags, achieved better than a "Poor."

In 2005, the Institute carried out side-impact tests on 14 small car models, simulating an impact with an SUV. Among these, the Neon performed the worst. IIHS stated that the Neon had "...major problems beginning with its structure. This car is a disaster...The structure is poor...If this had been a real driver in a real crash, it's likely it wouldn’t have been survivable...if safety is a priority, the Neon is a small car to be avoided."

Second generation headrests were rated as "Poor".

Driver deaths fatality risks statistics — published by the IIHS — rated the Neon and 15 other vehicles among the "Highest rates of driver deaths.", The Neon had 161 driver deaths per million registered vehicle years, while the average for the Neon class (4-door small) was 103. Other small cars on the list included the Acura RSX (202), Kia Spectra hatchback (191), and the Mitsubishi Eclipse (169).

Sales

Third generation (2016)

The third generation of the Dodge Neon is the sedan version of Fiat's Project Aegea, adapted for the Mexican and Middle Eastern markets as well as marking a comeback of the Neon nameplate after an 11-year absence. 

Released for the 2017 model year, around the same time the Dodge Dart was expected to end production, there were reports that it would be sold in the U.S. and Canadian markets by 2018 as a replacement for the Dart. Consistent with FCA's plans to dedicate U.S. production to Jeep and Ram vehicles while using the North American Free Trade Agreement to make Chrysler and Dodge passenger cars in Canada and Mexico, the Neon will be built and imported from Turkey. 

Plans to market the third-generation Neon vehicle north of Mexico were dropped following General Motors and Ford each paring down their own passenger car lineups in the U.S., including ending sales of potential compact-sized rivals Chevrolet Cruze and Ford Focus in North America.

References

External links

 Plymouth Neon on Chrysler website (archived, 9 Nov 2000)
 
 

Neon
Front-wheel-drive vehicles
Compact cars
Coupés
Sedans
2000s cars
2010s cars
Cars introduced in 1994
Motor vehicles manufactured in the United States